George King Stewart was a British businessman in Ceylon. He was an appointed member of the State Council of Ceylon, Chairmen of the Ceylon Chamber of Commerce and Chairman of the Ceylon Tea Propaganda Board.

References 

Date of birth missing
Members of the 1st State Council of Ceylon
People from British Ceylon